Ernest Booth may refer to:
Ernie Booth (1876–1935), New Zealand rugby union player
Ernest Granville Booth (1898–1959), American criminal and screenwriter